Hlengiwe Goodness Slindile Mavimbela is a South African politician and teacher who served as the Member of the Executive Council (MEC) for Sports, Recreation, Arts and Culture in the KwaZulu-Natal provincial government from May 2019 to August 2022. She was elected to the legislature in May 2019. Mavimbela is a member of the African National Congress.

Background
Mavimbela is from Umkhanyakude in northern KwaZulu-Natal. She is a teacher by profession. She is a member of the African National Congress. Mavimbela was the speaker of  Umkhanyakude District Municipality during the mayoralty of Jeff Vilane.

Provincial government
She was sworn in as a Member of the KwaZulu-Natal Legislature on 22 May 2019. On 28 May, premier Sihle Zikalala appointed Mavimbela as the Member of the Executive Council (MEC) for Sports, Recreation, Arts and Culture. She succeeded Bongi Sithole-Moloi and took office on the same day.

On 11 August 2022, Mavimbela resigned as MEC ahead of the newly elected premier Nomusa Dube-Ncube's cabinet announcement.

References

External links
Ms Hlengiwe Mavimbela: MEC For Arts, Culture, Sport and Recreation
Hlengiwe Mavimbela, Ms – South African Government

Living people
Year of birth missing (living people)
Zulu people
People from KwaZulu-Natal
Members of the KwaZulu-Natal Legislature
African National Congress politicians
21st-century South African politicians